Paul Duncan Raven (born 28 July 1970 in Salisbury, England) is a former professional footballer who played as a defender between 1987 and 2006. He notably played for West Bromwich Albion and Grimsby Town.

Career
Raven was added to the first-team squad at Doncaster Rovers in 1987. After his first season with Rovers, he moved to West Bromwich Albion. Raven played for Albion for the next eleven years, while also spending time on loan with former club Doncaster and Rotherham United.

In July 2000, Raven joined Grimsby Town on a free transfer. Grimsby were managed by Alan Buckley for whom he had previously played at West Brom. Although Buckley was sacked eight weeks later, Raven played for three years at Blundell Park.

In the summer of 2003, he joined Carlisle United along with fellow Grimsby player Steve Livingstone. During his time at Carlisle he scored once against York. After Carlisle, he played out the last two years of his career at Barrow.

Coaching career
Since 2012 Raven has been employed as an Executive in Education for the Professional Footballers' Association.

References

External links

Paul Raven profile at thefishy.co.uk

1970 births
Living people
Sportspeople from Salisbury
English footballers
Doncaster Rovers F.C. players
West Bromwich Albion F.C. players
Rotherham United F.C. players
Grimsby Town F.C. players
Carlisle United F.C. players
Barrow A.F.C. players
English Football League players
National League (English football) players
Association football defenders